Anton Victor, Viceroy of Lombardy–Venetia (full German name: Anton Viktor Joseph Johann Raimund von Österreich; 31 August 1779 – 2 April 1835) was an Archduke of Austria and a Grand Master of the Teutonic Knights. He was also briefly the last Archbishop and Elector of Cologne and Prince-Bishop of Münster before those territories were secularised in 1803.

Life

Anton Victor was the son of Leopold II, Holy Roman Emperor, and Maria Luisa of Spain. He was born in Florence and died in Vienna. He never married and died without issue.

After the death of his uncle, Maximilian Franz, Archbishop and Prince-Elector of Cologne and Prince-Bishop of Münster, Anton Victor was chosen on 9 September 1801 as Prince-Bishop of Münster and on 7 October as Archbishop and Prince Elector of Cologne. The Electorate’s Rhenish territories had been occupied by the French in 1794 and had in 1800 become part of France (in Cologne’s case as sub-prefecture of the new département de la Roër, based on Aix-la-Chapelle)/Aachen, this state of affairs preventing Anton from taking his seat in Cologne Cathedral (which had in any case been reduced by the revolutionaries to the status of a parish church, a status which it had up till then never possessed, but which it retained even after reinstatement of the archdiocese in 1821 until very recently) and leaving him in control only of the Duchy of Westphalia, as well as of the Prince-Bishopric of Münster. His reign was to prove a short one - in the reorganisation of the Holy Roman Empire as provided by its law of 1803 (at the time of writing still nameless) enacting the so-called Reichsdeputationshauptschluss (recte: Recès principal de la délégation extraordinaire d’Empire ‘Hauptschluß der außerordentlichen Reichsdeputation’, ‘chief recommendation of the select committee of the Reichstag’), the archiepiscopal electorates of Cologne and Trier were abolished and Anton’s remaining territories secularised, Münster being partitioned between the Prussians and various minor princes and Westphalia claimed by the Landgrave of Hesse-Darmstadt.

Anton Victor became Grand Master of the Teutonic Order in 1804. The order's German lands, centred on Mergentheim, were secularised in 1809, but Anton remained its Grand Master until his death. Between 1816 and 1818 he was Viceroy of the Kingdom of Lombardy–Venetia.

Ancestry

References

External links

Further reading
 
 Karl H. Lampe: Anton Victor Joseph Johann Raimund. In: Neue Deutsche Biographie (NDB). Vol. 1, Duncker & Humblot, Berlin 1953, pp. 317).
 Heinz Pardun: Die Wahl des letzten Kurfürsten von Köln Anton Viktor in Arnsberg. In: Zuflucht zwischen den Zeiten 1794–1803. Kölner Domschätze in Arnsberg. Arnsberg 1994, 

1779 births
1835 deaths
House of Habsburg-Lorraine
Austrian princes
Tuscan princes
Viceroys of the Kingdom of Lombardy–Venetia
Knights of the Golden Fleece of Austria
Grand Crosses of the Order of Saint Stephen of Hungary
Grand Masters of the Teutonic Order
Nobility from Florence
Italian Roman Catholics
Burials at the Imperial Crypt
Sons of emperors
Children of Leopold II, Holy Roman Emperor
Sons of kings